Adrian Hans Eduard Rappoldi (13 September 1876 – 12 October 1948) was a German violinist, son of Eduard and Laura Rappoldi.

Born in Berlin, he studied at the Dresden Conservatory with Leopold Auer (violin) and Felix Draeseke (composition), then in Berlin with Joseph Joachim and August Wilhelmj. From a young age, he performed with his mother. He was first violinist in the Benjamin Bilse orchestra, and then worked as a concert master in the Bilsesche Kapelle, later in Teplitz, Chemnitz and Helsinki, and from 1909 succeeded Henri Petri at the Dresden Conservatory. In 1910, he returned to Dresden, where he taught at the local Conservatory.

Rappoldi published two small collections of études (consisting partly of transcriptions, partly of his own works of didactic plan). He translated into German "The School of Violin Playing" by Mathieu Crikboma (1929).

The name "Rappoldi" bears the name of the violin by Antonio Stradivari (1719), acquired by the musician in 1910.

Rappoldi died in Bamberg at the age of 72.

References

External links 
 

German classical violinists
Male classical violinists
19th-century violinists
20th-century violinists
German music educators
1876 births
1948 deaths
Musicians from Berlin
19th-century German male musicians
20th-century German male musicians